George Raymond Reynolds (born 24 August 1936, Bundaberg, Queensland) is a former cricketer who played first-class cricket for Queensland from 1955 to 1964.

Life and career
Ray Reynolds was educated at Brisbane Church of England Grammar School. Five feet six inches tall, he was a "patient batsman with good concentration ... a neat stroke-player with a sound defensive technique". He made his first-class debut for Queensland in the 1955-56 season, batting at number seven. Later in the season he was promoted to the opening position. He missed the first two matches in 1956-57, but returned to the side to open the batting and finished the season with 371 runs at an average of 53.00, including his first century, 110 not out against South Australia after Queensland had followed on.

He improved further in 1957-58, leading Queensland's batting with 698 runs at 63.45. His season included three centuries, with his highest score of 203 not out against South Australia, when he batted throughout an innings of 452 for 8 declared; but he also twice made a pair. His innings of 174 against New South Wales took 515 minutes. He made a stumping while substituting as wicket-keeper in the match against Western Australia in Brisbane.

He continued to perform reliably over the next three seasons, scoring 500 runs at 38.46 in 1958-59, 671 runs at 39.47 in 1959-60, and 549 runs at 36.60 in 1960-61, forming a solid opening partnership with Sam Trimble.

He played two seasons in the Central Lancashire League for Royton, scoring 848 runs at 40.38 in 1962, and 836 runs at 41.80 in 1963. Unusually for a league professional, he did not bowl.

He returned for one last season with Queensland in 1963-64, scoring more heavily than ever, with 815 runs at 58.21, four centuries, and an opening partnership of 256 with Trimble against South Australia.

He retired from the game, at the age of 27, to take up sugar cane farming near Bundaberg. He later served as a Queensland selector from 1979 to 1985.

References

External links
 
 Raymond Reynolds at CricketArchive

1936 births
Living people
Australian cricketers
Queensland cricketers
Sportspeople from Bundaberg
Cricketers from Queensland
Australian farmers
People educated at Anglican Church Grammar School